Salvia chicamochae is an annual herb that is endemic to the Chicamocha canyon, in the far north of Boyacá in Colombia. It is found at  elevation, on steep rocky slopes, in open arid bushland.

The  cylindrical corolla tube is white, the  upper lip pale blue, and the  lower lip bright blue, flowering from October to December.

Notes

chicamochae
Endemic flora of Colombia